Tza'ar ba'alei chayim, literally "suffering of living creatures", is a Jewish commandment which bans causing animals unnecessary suffering. This concept is not clearly enunciated in the written Torah, but was accepted by the Talmud as being a biblical mandate. It is linked in the Talmud from the biblical law requiring people to assist in unloading burdens from animals.

Literal meaning
Tza'ar is an (ancient) Hebrew word for "suffering" and is used in this context with the meaning of "suffering that does not advance some legitimate human good", according to The Oxford Handbook of Jewish Ethics and Morality. Ba'alei chayim is an expression literally meaning "owners of life", which is used in the Talmud for "animals".

Laws

Slaughter

In traditional Jewish law, kosher animals may be eaten if killed using the slaughter method known as shechitah, where the animal is killed by having its throat cut swiftly using an extremely sharp and specially designed knife. Many rabbis assert that these regulations were put in place to reduce the animal's suffering and to ensure that the animal has the easiest possible death. The design of the kosher knives as well as regulation relating to how the cut is made have been seen to greatly reduce or completely eliminate reaction from the kosher cut. Even modern-day scientists critical of shechita agree that it greatly improved welfare at slaughter in historical periods, though experts disagree regarding shechita's efficacy compared to modern slaughter methods.

In 2000, the Rabbinical Assembly of Conservative Judaism's Committee on Jewish Law and Standards banned the common slaughter method of "shackling and hoisting" (pulling a conscious animal into the air with a chain before slaughter). Rabbis Joel Roth and Elliot Dorff wrote a responsum on this topic which concluded that shackling and hoisting "unquestionably constitutes a violation of Jewish laws that forbid us to cause undue pain to animals."

Animal research
According to the Shulkhan Aruch, "anything that is necessary for medical purposes, or for anything else, is exempt from the prohibition of causing suffering to animals".

Most Jewish authorities allow medical research if it will help people in need, and if the animals do not undergo any unnecessary suffering. Reform Judaism's Central Conference of American Rabbis, for example, affirms that animal research is permissible if it will save human lives, so long as animals are subjected to little pain and not used in "frivolous" experiments such as cosmetic testing.

In the Noahide Code
A concern for suffering caused to animals is found in Judaism's Seven Laws of Noah, which apply to all humankind. One of the seven laws, ever min ha chai, prohibits eating the flesh of live animals.

Vegetarianism and veganism 

A number of authorities have described tza'ar ba'alei chayim as requiring or leading to the adoption of a vegetarian or vegan diet. Israeli rabbi Asa Kesiar has argued that the slaughter of animals in contemporary times violates tza'ar ba'alei chayim and should not be considered kosher. Israeli rabbi Simchah Roth has argued that contemporary slaughter "constitutes cruelty to animals [tza'ar ba'alei chayim] which is forbidden by the Torah." American rabbi Geoffrey Claussen has written that considering tza'ar ba'alei chayim may lead to "committing to a vegan diet and boycotting the animal agriculture industry." American author Richard H. Schwartz has claimed that tza'ar ba'alei chayim is a central reason for Jews to become vegetarians.

Orthodox Judaism, however, firmly reject these views. Orthodox Jews believe that God created the entire world, including animals, for the enjoyment of man. In regards to the consumption of animals specifically, the biblical laws of slaughter, as well as portions of the Bible that relate anecdotes of Jews eating meat, clearly indicate this view.

Other areas of concern for animals in Jewish law
Resting on the Sabbath also meant providing rest for the working animals, and people are instructed to feed their animals before they sit down to eat.

At harvest time, the working animals must not be muzzled, so that they can eat of the harvest as they work.

The underlying concern is for the welfare of the animals, particularly the weaker of the pair.

Sports like bullfighting are forbidden by most authorities. Rabbi Ovadia Yosef has characterized bullfighting as "a culture of sinful and cruel people" which is opposed by Torah values.

Narrative traditions
One midrash declares compassion for animals to have been the merit of Moses that made him the shepherd of his people. This midrash has sometimes been linked with tza'ar ba'alei chayim.

In one narrative in the Babylonian Talmud, Judah ha-Nasi saw in his own ailment the punishment for having once failed to show compassion for a frightened calf.  This midrash has sometimes also been linked with tza'ar ba'alei chayim.

Organizations

The Shamayim V'Aretz Institute
The Shamayim V'Aretz Institute is a Jewish animal protection group that educates leaders, trains advocates, and leads campaigns for the humane treatment of animals. Shamyim V'Aretz is led by rabbi Shmuly Yanklowitz and has run campaigns which seek to end: kosher certification of veal, the practice of kapparot, and the  kosher certifying of cattle that are killed using shackle and hoist techniques.

Magen Tzedek
Enforcing a commitment to tza'ar ba'alei chayim in food production has been part of the effort of Conservative Judaism's Magen Tzedek commission, formerly known as Hekshher Tzedek. The Magen Tzedek commission sees compliance with the Humane Farm Animal Care Standards (HFAC) as sufficiently preventing unnecessary suffering to animals. Amid disputed claims of Orthodox opposition the Magen Tzedek commission has not been successful in recruiting any food producers into its certification program.

The Jewish Initiative For Animals
The Jewish Initiative For Animals (JIFA) supports innovative programs that seek to turn the Jewish value of tza'ar ba'alei chayim into action and build Jewish American communities in the process. In November 2016 JIFA partnered with kosher meat distributors KOL Foods and Grow and Behold to bring a run of kosher certified heritage breed chickens to market for the first time in approximately 50 years. Heritage breed chickens and turkeys are able to achieve highest possible welfare outcomes. Thus, the renewed availability of heritage chicken to kosher consumer has helped expand values of tza'ar ba'alei chayim within the modern kosher meat industry. JIFA has also sought to spread the values of tza'ar ba'alei chayim into the Jewish world through its Ark Project, a service-learning curriculum for b’nai mitzvah. This curriculum seeks to engages with Jewish teaching and real life problems about topics such as homeless animals, animals used in entertainment, farmed animal welfare, conservation of wildlife and more.

Jewish Veg 
Jewish Veg is an organization whose mission is to encourage and help Jews to embrace plant-based diets. The organization teaches that "tsa'ar baalei chaim, the prohibition on causing animals pain, is one of the most beautiful teachings in Judaism. Our Jewish sacred texts strongly emphasize compassion for animals, and strongly oppose the infliction of suffering on another living creature."

Hazon 
Hazon is a Jewish environmental education organization. In December 2015, it introduced animal welfare as a core value of its agenda. The organization teaches that "preventing unnecessary cruelty to animals, or tzaar baalei chayim, is a core value in Judaism."

See also
 Jewish vegetarianism

Further reading
 
 
 Labendz, Jacob Ari; Yanklowitz, Shmuly (2019). Jewish Veganism and Vegetarianism: Studies and New Directions. SUNY Press.

References

External links
 MyJewishLearning.com: Ethical Treatment of Animals in Judaism
 Jewish perspectives from the Humane Society
 The Jewish Initiative For Animals 

Jewish ethics
Jewish law principles
Animal welfare
Negative Mitzvoth
Jewish vegetarianism
Animals in Judaism